Bob Carr Theater (originally the Orlando Municipal Auditorium and formerly the Bob Carr Performing Arts Centre) is an auditorium located in Orlando, Florida. Opening in 1927, the venue is currently owned by the City of Orlando and is managed by Dr. Phillips Center for the Performing Arts. In 2015, the site was integrated into the Creative Village Development plan, facing major renovations in 2018.

History
The venue was proposed in 1925 after the city saw a population boom in the early 1920s. In 1926, the land reserved for the Orange County Fair was used for the auditorium. The venue opened on February 21, 1927, with a performance of Aida by the La Scala Grand Opera Company. Throughout the years, the venue became an entertainment mecca, with performances by: Marty Robbins, Andy Griffith and Elvis Presley.

In 1974, the Orlando City Council decided to renovated the auditorium and transform it into a state of the art theater and concert hall. Renovations began October 1975. In May 1978, the venue was christened the "Mayor Bob Carr Performing Arts Centre", in honor of Bob Carr (mayor of Orlando from 1956 to 1967).

The structural and technical changes to the theater helped it become the home to the Orlando Ballet, Orlando Philharmonic Orchestra, Festival of Orchestras and Broadway Across America. With the opening of the Dr. Phillips Center in 2014, many performances held here were moved to the new theater. Dance recitals and orchestral shows are slated to move to the Steinmetz Hall in 2019.

Future use
In 2015, the site will be integrated into "Creative Village", a mixed-use commercial and residential development. The plans for the theater as currently unknown. However, developers feel the venue is integral to Orlando's history and will remain. It is believed the theater will become a performance for digital and alternative arts.

References

External links
Orlando: A Visual History - Orlando Municipal Auditorium
Orlando Municipal Auditorium

Music venues in Florida
Concert halls in Florida
Buildings and structures in Orlando, Florida
Music venues in Orlando, Florida
Performing arts centers in Florida
Tourist attractions in Orlando, Florida
1927 establishments in Florida
Theatres completed in 1927